Daniel Newton (born 30 December 1989) is a Welsh born rugby union footballer currently playing for Valorugby Emilia in Top12.
He can play at Fly-half or Full back.

Newton is also an ex-Wales U20 international, having made 5 appearances at the 2009 U20 World Championship.

References

External links
 Scarlets Profile
It's Rugby Profile

1989 births
Living people
Rugby union players from Carmarthen
Scarlets players
Welsh rugby union players
Valorugby Emilia players
Rugby union fly-halves
Welsh expatriate rugby union players
Welsh expatriate sportspeople in Italy
Rugby Club I Medicei players
Alumni of the University of Wales Trinity Saint David
Carmarthen Quins RFC players
London Scottish F.C. players
Llanelli RFC players